"Drive Away/Shiawase no Jōken" is the second single by the band Girl Next Door and it was released on October 8, 2008. Drive away was used as the commercial song for Toyota Technical Development Corp. while Shiawase no Jōken was used as the ending theme for Osama no Branch.

CD track listing 
 Drive Away
 Shiawase no Jōken (幸福の条件)
 Drive Away (Maximizor Mix)
 Drive Away (Ice Cream Mix)

DVD track listing 
 Drive Away (Music Video: Special Version)

Charts

Oricon Sales Chart

Billboard Japan

External links 
 Official website 

2008 singles
Girl Next Door (band) songs
2008 songs
Avex Trax singles
Song articles with missing songwriters